Cantate is a Latin word, meaning "sing!". It has become part of words in other languages, such as the French Cantate and the German Kantate, both meaning cantata. Cantata may refer to:

 Cantate Domino, or Psalm 98
 Cantate Sunday, a Sunday of the church year for which the reading begins with the word
 Cantate!, a Catholic hymnal in German
 Cantate de Noël, a Christmas cantata
 Cantate FM, a radio station of the Vatican
 Cantate (typeface)

See also